Kuik-e Majid (also Romanized as Kū’īk-e Majīd; also known as Kūyakī Majīd, Kūyakī-ye Majīd, and Kūyekī-ye Majīd) is a village in Dasht-e Zahab Rural District, in the Central District of Sarpol-e Zahab County, Kermanshah Province, Iran. At the 2006 census, its population was 230, in 48 families.

References 

Populated places in Sarpol-e Zahab County